2018 FC Ryukyu season.

Squad
As of 10 February 2018.

J3 League

References

External links
 J.League official site

FC Ryukyu
FC Ryukyu seasons